Fernando Figueroa Rodríguez (2 July 1925 – 22 February 2011) was a Mexican footballer. He competed in the men's tournament at the 1948 Summer Olympics.

References

External links
 
 

1925 births
2011 deaths
Mexican footballers
Mexico international footballers
Olympic footballers of Mexico
Footballers at the 1948 Summer Olympics
Place of birth missing
Association football defenders
Club Puebla players